Rinkin of Dragon's Wood is a children's book by Thora Colson published in Britain in 1965. It was Colson's first novel and was illustrated by Pat Marriott. It was also published in the United States by Dutton, and the German translation was published in Austria by Ueberreuter.

Plot summary
The story follows the life of a young fox in the English countryside. He learns to fight and hunt, survives a drought and an encounter with a train, and takes a mate.

References

External links
 A review of the book
 Review by Kirkus

1965 British novels
1965 children's books
1965 debut novels
British children's novels
Books about foxes
Literature featuring anthropomorphic foxes
Children's novels about animals
Jonathan Cape books